Bartolomeo III Arese count of Castel Lambro born in Milan on 23 October 1590 and died in the same city on 23 September 1674 was an Italian nobleman, politician, and prominent member of the House of Arese.

Biography 

Bartolomeo Arese son of nobleman Giulio I Arese was born in Milan on October 23, 1590. His father belonged to a rich Milanese family of "nobility of toga" which, especially between the sixteenth and seventeenth centuries, was the center of bureaucracy in the Milanese domains. His paternal grandmother, Hippolita Clari, was the daughter of Giulio (1525-1575), a famous jurist from Alexandria, who, for almost two centuries before Cesare Beccaria, set up the first Code of "Criminal Procedure" in Milan.

While governing the Milanese domains, Bartolomeo III was the city's principle patron of baroque architecture, art, and music, commissioning Palazzo Arese (later Arese Litta) in Milan by Francesco Maria Richini, extensive additions to Palazzo Arese (later Arese Borromeo) in Cesano Maderno, renovations of San Nicolao, Milan and Santa Maria alla Porta, Milan by Francesco Borromini, the Arese Chapel (Chapel of the Assumption) in San Vittore al Corpo, Milan by Antonio Busca, painting cycles by Giuseppe Nuvolone, Ercole Procaccini the Younger, Luigi Pellegrini Scaramuccia, and Giovanni Stefano Danedi in the Ducal Palace of Milan (now Royal Palace of Milan), and concertos by Francesco Rognoni Taeggio, Giovanni Battista Beria, Teodoro Casati, Federico Pedroni, and Carlo Giuseppe Sanromano.

Bibliography 
  Leti, Il governo del duca of Ossuna and the vita di Bartolomeo Arese, Milan, 1678.
  Gualdo Priorato, Relazione della città e stato di Milano sotto il governo dell'ecc.mo sig. Don Luigi of Guzman Ponze di Leone, Milan, 1666.

Notes

External links 
 Bartolomeo Arese - treccani.it 

1590 births
1674 deaths
Nobility from Milan
Politicians from Milan